Martin Vidnovic (born January 4, 1948) is an American actor and singer.

Career
Born in Falls Church, Virginia, Vidnovic graduated from the College-Conservatory of Music (part of the University of Cincinnati) with a Bachelor of Fine Arts.

Vidnovic made his Broadway debut in the ill-fated Home Sweet Homer (1976) which, following a one-year tour, closed on opening night. He fared better with his next three projects, revivals of The King and I (1977) as Lun Tha, Oklahoma! (1979) as Jud Fry, and Brigadoon (1980) as Tommy Albright. Vidnovic's performance in Baby (1983) won him the Drama Desk Award for Outstanding Featured Actor in a Musical. Additional Broadway credits include Guys and Dolls (1992), A Grand Night for Singing (1993), and King David (1997).

He was cast in the 1998 stage adaptation of Footloose but was replaced during previews.

Off-Broadway, Vidnovic was cast as El Gallo late in the run of the original production of The Fantasticks and appeared in the 2006 revival as Bellomy. Additional off-Broadway credits include Lies and Legends: The Musical Stories of Harry Chapin (1985), Olympus on My Mind (1986), and the 2003 Jerry Herman revue Showtune.

Family
Vidnovic was briefly married to voice teacher Linda Wonneberger in the late 1970s, and the couple have a daughter, the actress Laura Benanti.

Vidnovic is also the uncle of former Minor Threat bassist Steve Hansgen.

Additional nominations
1981 Tony Award for Best Actor in a Musical (Brigadoon) 
1981 Drama Desk Award for Outstanding Actor in a Musical (Brigadoon) 
1980 Drama Desk Award for Outstanding Featured Actor in a Musical (Oklahoma!)

References

External links

Lortel Archives listing

American male musical theatre actors
American male stage actors
American male singers
1948 births
Male actors from Virginia
Drama Desk Award winners
Living people
People from Falls Church, Virginia
American male voice actors
American people of Serbian descent